William Peterkin was a Scotland international rugby union player.

Rugby Union career

Amateur career

He played for Edinburgh University. He captained the side.

Provincial career

He played for Edinburgh District in the 1880 inter-city match, scoring 2 tries in the match.

He played for East of Scotland District in the 5 February 1881 match against West of Scotland District.

International career

He was capped 8 times for Scotland between 1881 and 1885.

Other sports

He was named in The Athletic News of 6 July 1881. The newspaper decried his slump in the Shot put remarking that last year [1880] he putted the 'cannonball' a distance of 39 feet and  6 inches, while this year he only managed a distance of 37 feet and 2 inches. Likewise his throwing the hammer attracted 87 feet and 7 inches; coming in first was H. H. Johnstone in that event with 89 feet and 6 inches.

He was a Scottish champion in the 100 yards sprint, and in the quarter mile sprint. He won the 1883 S.A.A.A. Championships in Powderhall in those events; and also came second in the weight putt or Shot put. John Smith, the Scotland football internationalist and Edinburgh District full back came in second to Peterkin in the 100 yards sprint.

He was named in the East Committee of the Scottish Amateur Athletics Association in 1888, alongside A. G. G. Asher and Alec Cameron.

Family

His parents were William Arthur Peterkin (1823-1906) and Elizabeth Mitchell Barclay (1823-1901). His father was a clerk of the Board of Supervision when that was established after the Poor Law commission; and was a visiting officer of the Poor Houses in Scotland. He was also connected with the Monks of St. Giles, a literary and social body in Edinburgh. William was one of their 10 children; William and Elizabeth had 3 boys and 7 girls.

His grandfather was Alexander Peterkin S. S. C., who was the legal agent of the Church of Scotland at the time of disruption; and was acquainted with Sir Walter Scott.

He married Anna Maria Baker in 1901 in Brighton, England.

References

1857 births
1945 deaths
Scottish rugby union players
Scotland international rugby union players
Edinburgh University RFC players
Edinburgh District (rugby union) players
East of Scotland District players
Rugby union players from Edinburgh
Rugby union forwards